Onias II (Hebrew: חוֹנִיּוֹ Ḥōniyyō or Honio or Honiyya ben Shimon; Greek: Onias Simonides) was the son of Simon I. He was still a minor when his father died, so that his uncle Eleazar, and after him the latter's uncle Manasseh, officiated as high priests before he himself succeeded to that dignity. According to Josephus, he was a covetous man and of limited intelligence, whose refusal to pay the twenty talents of silver which every high priest was required to pay to the King of Egypt threatened to imperil both the high priest and the people; but at this juncture Joseph, the clever son of Tobias and nephew of Onias, succeeded in pacifying Ptolemy III Euergetes (reigned 246 to 222 BC). Onias is said to have died, almost simultaneously with his nephew Joseph, during the reign of Seleucus IV Philopator (reigned 187 BC to 175 BC), hence about 181 BC. His successor in office was Simon II.

Patrilineal ancestry

References

Resources
Gottheil, Richard and Samuel Krauss. "Onias". Jewish Encyclopedia. Funk and Wagnalls, 1901–1906, which cites to the following bibliography: 
H. P. Chajes, Beiträge zur Nordsemitischen Onomatologie, p. 23, Vienna, 1900 (on the name);
Herzfeld, Gesch. des Volkes Jisrael, i. 185-189, 201-206;
Heinrich Grätz, Gesch. 2d ed., ii. 236;
Emil Schürer, Gesch. 3d ed., i. 182, 194-196; iii. 97-100;
Niese, in Hermes, xxxv. 509;
Wellhausen, I. J. G. 4th ed., p. 248, Berlin, 1901;
Willrich, Juden und Griechen vor der Makkabäischen Erhebung, pp. 77, 109, Göttingen, 1895;
Adolf Büchler, Die Tobiaden und die Oniaden, pp. 166, 240, 275, 353, Vienna, 1899;
J. P. Mahaffy, The Empire of the Ptolemies, pp. 217, 353, London, 1895;
Gelzer, Sextus Julius Africanus, ii. 170-176, Leipsic, 1885;
Isaac Hirsch Weiss, Dor, i. 130 (on the halakic view of the temple of Onias).

3rd-century BCE High Priests of Israel
2nd-century BCE High Priests of Israel
Ptolemaic Jews